Melatonin Magik is the ninth studio album by rap artist Canibus. The album contains a prolonged guest appearance by Professor Griff of Public Enemy who provides introductory or hype vocals on numerous songs. The album also features production from a collective of producers such as Sicknature and ENG, as well as performance appearances by fellow rap artists such as DZK and Warbux of Warlab Records, Blaq Poet, K-Solo, and D12, among others.

Artwork 
The conceptual artwork for Melatonin Magik is partly inspired by the feature film The Matrix, depicting Canibus in a meditative posture surrounded by chains and broken glass. The red pill and blue pills that levitate from his hands allude to the central protagonist's choice between the two. The graphic design artist credited with its illustration was commissioned by Canibus himself through Spitboss.

Track list

Deluxe Edition 
A deluxe edition of Melatonin Magik featuring two bonus tracks, "Wu-Flix" and "Fraternity of the Impoverished (Extended Mix)", was released digitally on February 9, 2010.

Controversy 
The song "Air Strike (Pop Killer)" generated controversy as Canibus reignited a feud with longtime rival Eminem and used D12 verses secured by DZK to create the illusion that they had sided with him.

Reception 
The album received mixed to positive reviews, with RapReviews awarding it a 9 out of 10.

Charts

References

2010 albums
Canibus albums